Jules François Marie Duplessis Kergomard, called Gustave de Penmarch (14 July 1822, in Morlaix – 28 March 1901, in Morlaix) was a 19th-century French poet and chansonnier.

The husband of Pauline Kergomard (née Reclus) whom he married in 1863, he wrote under her pseudonym many poems often set in music by Alfred Dufresne. In 1875, he published the posthumous works of Gustave de Penmarch who was none other than himself.  Jules Duplessis-Kergomard was a penniless man of letters with little interest in working; The couple had two children.

Works 
1851: Heureuse !, poetry, music by Dufresne
1851: Les Feux follets, poems
1853: Reflets de Printemps, poetry, music by Dufresne
1854: La Colombe, poetry, music by Dufresne
1854: Écoute, poetry, music by Dufresne
1854: L’Étoile, poetry, music by Dufresne
1854: L'Heure des adieux, poetry, music by Dufresne
1854: Le Sommeil des fleurs, poetry, music by Dufresne
1855: Sous la tonnelle, poetry, music by Dufresne
1857: Les Voix dans l'air, rêverie, music by Dufresne
1858: Adieu paniers vendanges sont faites, song, music by Dufresne
1861: Essai biographique sur Marie Rouault, directeur du Musée géologique de Rennes, in La Sylphide 30 August
1865: Les Filles romanesques, published under his real name
1868: Enora, poems
1875: Gustave de Penmarch. Œuvres posthumes d'un poète breton, preface by Jules Kergomard
1878: Le Sommeil des fleurs, poetry, music by Dufresne modernised by Camille Saint-Saëns
1880: Washington

Bibliography 
 Edmond Antoine Poinsot, Dictionnaire des pseudonymes, 1869,
  Kergomard (Geneviève et Alain), Pauline Kergomard, 2000

References

External links 
 Gustave de Penmarch on data.bnf.fr

19th-century French poets
French chansonniers
1822 births
People from Morlaix
1901 deaths